is a series of nonlinear science fiction action games published by Nintendo, featuring both side-scrolling and first-person shooter elements. The player character and protagonist of the series is Samus Aran, a spacefaring bounty hunter that battles Space Pirates and an extraterrestrial species called the Metroid.

Overview

Key:

 = Does Not Appear

 A dark grey cell indicates that the character was not in the property or that the character's presence in the property has yet to be announced.
 A Main indicates a character had a starring role in the property.
 A Recurring indicates the character appeared in two or more times within the property.
 A Guest indicates the character appeared once in the property.

Protagonists

Samus Aran

 is a bounty hunter and the protagonist of the series. Her homeworld was attacked by the Space Pirates, and her parents were murdered by their leader Ridley when she was young, which led to her being taken in by the Chozo, who saved her life and raised her to become a warrior.

Chozo
The Chozo are a mysterious, sage-like species that are featured throughout the Metroid series. The origins and age of the Chozo race and civilization are unknown, they were once spread across several planets in the Metroid universe, with their home planet being ZDR. Lore entries in Metroid Prime suggest that the race may have traveled to a higher plane of being as opposed to dying out. The Chozo were extremely advanced in technology, and took pride in their elaborate statuary. They also exchanged knowledge with other species, including the Luminoth of Aether, the Reptilicus of Bryyo, and the Elysians of Elysia (robots which the Chozo themselves built). Lore found in Metroid Prime 3 specifically mentions a fellowship of enlightened species that once existed between the Chozo, the Luminoth, the Reptilicus, and another race called the Ylla. While the former three have been expounded on in the series, the Ylla are only mentioned in this piece of lore and have yet to be seen. The Chozo were also responsible for raising Samus, infusing her with their DNA and creating her Power Suit, and for the creation and breeding of Metroids to combat the X Parasites. While in the Japanese versions of the games, the beings are only ever identified by the generic term , a misunderstanding during the localization process led to the mistaken adoption of the descriptor , rendered "Chozo", in the English versions instead. In Super Metroid, some of the Chozo statues would rise up and attack Samus; these bosses are called Torizo, substituting the native Japanese word tori "bird" for the usual, Chinese-derived chō. In the late game of Metroid Prime Chozo ghosts appear and attack Samus. Although originally allies, the Chozo became maddened by the Phazon corruption of their planet, and could no longer distinguish friend from foe. In Metroid Zero Mission, Samus is able to enter the Chozo Ruins.

In Metroid Dread, the social structure of the Chozo is explored, revealing they are split into two tribes: the peaceful Thoha, who left their warrior traditions behind to become scientists, and the Mawkin, who retained a warrior culture. The Thoha initially colonized SR388 and encountered the X parasites, genetically engineering the Metroids to serve as their predators. For this reason, the Metroids are calm in the presence of Thoha genes and hostile towards Mawkin. While the Thoha feared both species, the leader of the Mawkin, Raven Beak, saw potential in the Metroids, and ordered the killing of all but one Thoha (Quiet Robe) so they would not obstruct his plans. However, one Mawkin soldier was infected with an X while returning to ZDR and a pandemic broke out, leaving Raven Beak and Quiet Robe the only known living Chozo when Metroid Dread takes place. Since they are both killed during the game, as of Dread the Chozo are believed to be extinct.

In Metroid Manga, which is a prequel to the game series, two Chozo who had a hand in Samus's origins were introduced: Old Bird and Gray Voice. When Samus lost her family to the Space Pirates, they took her under their wings and raised her to become the galactic savior she is today, and Gray Voice was one of the Chozos who donated his DNA to Samus. Gray Voice later joined the Space Pirates under a cover mission to destroy the renegade Mother Brain.

Galactic Federation
The  is the governing body of the galaxy formed by an alliance of alien species and often contracts Samus with difficult missions to complete, with the aim of eradicating the Space Pirates. Samus trained in the Federation's military before becoming a bounty hunter, leaving some time after a disagreement with her commanding officer, Adam Malkovich. The Galactic Federation's troopers also use powered armor, and their technology usually bears multiple versions of their symbol, a stylized cross-shape. Troopers are also given a basic repeating assault weapon, and in Metroid Prime 3, some are equipped with the Phazon Enhancement Device.

Baby Metroid
The Metroid larva is chronologically the last Metroid of its race following the events of Metroid II: Return of Samus and its remake Metroid: Samus Returns. At the beginning of Super Metroid, Samus describes how a Metroid larva hatched from an egg and immediately imprinted upon her, believing her to be its mother. She brought the larva to Ceres Space Colony, where scientists learned that they could harness its power. Just after she left the colony, she received a distress call and returned to find the scientists dead, and the larva stolen. The Baby Metroid is used as the driving theme of the game as Samus tirelessly searches through Zebes and eventually the Space Pirate's base on Tourian for the Metroid hatchling. Once encountering the enlarged Baby Metroid in Space Pirate clutches, it attacks Samus and nearly drains all her energy. During the final battle against Mother Brain, the Baby Metroid comes to Samus' aid by recharging her energy, but is destroyed by the Mother Brain. Samus avenges its death by destroying Mother Brain with an extremely powerful weapon given to her by the Metroid. After a planet-wide self-destruction, Samus mourns the death of the Metroid.

In Metroid: Other M, the Baby Metroid is mentioned in the opening cutscene as it serves as a reminder for Samus' loss of loved ones in her life. Later in the game, on Bottle Ship's Sector Zero, she encounters a Metroid that resembles something similar to the Baby Metroid, but it immediately attacks her only to be saved by Adam Malkovich.

Antagonists

Metroids

The  are floating, parasitic jellyfish-like organisms with tripartite nuclei. They are capable of siphoning an undetectable life energy from any life form, generally causing the death of the victim in the process. Created by the Chozo as a type of bioweapon in order to combat the more dangerous X Parasites, they are one of the primary plot points in the Metroid games as Samus either fights them or tries to prevent the Space Pirates or Galactic Federation from harnessing their powers for evil.

Mother Brain

 is a recurring game boss and a major antagonist in the series. The Chozo created it as a councilor, and as a means to "accelerate their plan to link the galaxy into one unified society". During the Space Pirate invasion of Zebes, it saw the Space Pirates as a "perfect force capable of restoring true order to the universe", and successfully established itself as one of their leaders. At the same time, Mother Brain attempted to persuade Samus to be an ally in order to "build a new age for the universe" by claiming that because it built the power suit that Samus wears, she is indebted to Mother Brain. Mother Brain is depicted as a very large brain with cybernetic spikes and a single eye; usually contained in a glass tube which Samus must break in order to injure it. In Super Metroid, Mother Brain also rises from the floor and reveals a grotesque body after her tank is destroyed. Samus seemingly destroys Mother Brain in the original Metroid, but again confronts it in Super Metroid. It was revealed in Metroid Prime 3 that the Galactic Federation had constructed biomechanical supercomputers called Auroras, and that there were plans for a "Future Aurora Complex", which appears to be the Mother Brain depicted in Super Metroid. In the first cutscene for Metroid: Other M, the scene of Mother Brain destroying the baby Metroid is reenacted in an FMV cutscene, and the main antagonist, MB, is an android housing an AI cloned from Mother Brain's genetic material from Samus' suit.

MB

MB, nicknamed  by her adoptive mother Dr. Madeline Bergman, was created by the scientists of the Bottle Ship as a copy of the original Mother Brain, whose genetic material was harvested from Samus' Power Suit following Mother Brain's death in Super Metroid, in order to control the Metroids and the Zebesians, an offshoot form of Space Pirates, that were being mass-produced in Sector Zero of said starship.

Originally, MB was only a computer software, but due to its inability to interact personally with the Metroids, the scientists decided to give her an artificial human body in the hopes of having her bond in a more organic way with the Metroids, mimicking Samus' mother-son-like relationship with the "baby". As MB gained emotions of her own just like the original Mother Brain once did, the scientists decided to reprogram her AI; something Madeline was initially opposed to but ultimately accepted when faced with the dangers of keeping her active.

Madeline rejecting her safety and the discovery of the Galactic Federation's initial military purposes for her caused her to have a meltdown, which inadvertently led to the remaining Mother Brain DNA within her corrupting and controlling her software, and she forced the Bottle Ship on a collision course. Melissa was confronted by both Samus and Madeline after her Queen Metroid had been killed. Despite their attempts to persuade her not to become violent, she did not listen and tried to kill them both, only to get shot down by the Marines under the Federation colonel's orders.

Space Pirates
They are a group of "interstellar nomads" resembling humanoid reptiles, insects, or crustaceans who plunder colonies and ships and exist in an insect-like hive society. Considering their appearance throughout the series, especially the Prime series, they could be considered arthropod-like reptiles. A single Pirate may have many biological differences from the other individuals of their species, most likely because of their willingness to perform self-experimentation and mutation. Important leaders include Ridley, the Space Pirate commander, Mother Brain, the bio-mechanical defense of Zebes controlled by the Space Pirates, and Kraid, a recurring boss. The organization also includes a winged, mantis-like species, the Ki Hunters. The Space Pirates are interested in Metroid research, especially in using Metroids for energy generation, as soldiers, and for experimentation – their Phazon experiments produced all the Metroid variants seen in the Prime games with the exception of Metroid Prime itself. The organization is destroyed during the climax of Super Metroid, but a group within the Galactic Federation itself resurrects the Space Pirates, along with Ridley and the Metroids, to be used as bio-weapons, explaining their continued presence in Other M and Fusion.

Series director Yoshio Sakamoto stated that the Space Pirates that invaded Zebes took "Zebesian" as a general name for themselves after the conquest of the planet, comparing it to people who referred themselves as "Americans" when they emigrated to the United States.

Ridley

 is the archenemy of Samus Aran, an intelligent and sadistic dragon-like extraterrestrial that despite being killed multiple times by her, is always revived by the Space Pirates (or accidentally by the Galactic Federation in Metroid: Other M) using cloning or robotics. Other than Samus and the titular Metroids, Ridley is the only character that has appeared consistently throughout most of the games in the series (the exceptions being Metroid II: Return of Samus for the Game Boy, Metroid Prime 2: Echoes for the GameCube, Metroid Prime Hunters for the Nintendo DS, Metroid Prime: Federation Force for the Nintendo 3DS, and Metroid Dread for the Nintendo Switch). He is directly responsible for the invasion of Samus' home planet, and the death of her parents, and is the franchise's primary villain, despite not typically acting as the main antagonist in an individual game.

Kraid
 is a gigantic lizard-like beast and as a member of the Space Pirate's High Command. His most prominent feature is his grotesquely oversized belly. First appearing in the original Metroid, he is the first part of the mini-boss duo along with Ridley. In Super Metroid he appears in his giant form, two screens tall and almost a screen wide. Metroid: Zero Mission retconned his size and appearance, showing he did not grow between games. He was also slated to appear in Metroid Prime as a boss in the Phazon Mines, with a metal dome covering his head and blue Phazon veins on his belly, but was removed due to time constraints. Kraid returns in Metroid Dread where he is shown as the first and most significant boss of Cataris, a lava filled zone used to heat the rest of the area he is present in, and is the second boss of the overall game.  Kraid also makes an appearance in the background of the Brinstar Depths stage in Super Smash Bros. Melee and Super Smash Bros. Ultimate where he periodically slashes and rotates the stage.

Metroid Prime / Dark Samus
Metroid Prime and its alternate form Dark Samus is the main antagonist of the Prime subseries. It is a strange, black-carapace, red-eyed creature with a humanoid face within its shell and the ability to control and horribly mutate anything it attaches to. Metroid Prime appears in Metroid Prime as the final boss, and after its defeat, reforms itself by stealing Samus' Phazon Suit to become Dark Samus, a black-colored doppelgänger of Samus.

Metroid Prime appeared in Tallon IV shortly after the impact of the Leviathan, a living Phazon meteor fused with a Metroid unfortunate enough to cross its path. It caused severe damage to the Chozo colony before the Artifact Temple was built to contain Metroid Prime inside the impact crater of the Leviathan. According to the NTSC version of Metroid Prime, Space Pirate miners eventually discovered the creature, eventually dubbing it "Metroid Prime" after containing it with security units and drones brought to their laboratories to perform experiments. Metroid Prime eventually broke free and managed to assimilate several weapons and defense systems from fallen security units before going back to the impact crater. However, the PAL and Trilogy versions deny this, with the Pirate Logs only stating the Pirates picked up life signals coming from within the Artifact Temple. After Samus gets all of the artifacts, she is able to enter the impact crater and fight Metroid Prime. After its defeat, the creature takes Samus' Phazon Suit to reconstruct itself into a body similar to hers, resulting in the being referred to as "Dark Samus".

In Metroid Prime 2: Echoes, Dark Samus arrives in Aether while chasing the planet's Phazon. Shortly after, Samus arrives and encounters Dark Samus many times, eventually defeating her as Dark Aether was destroyed - but a post-credits scene shows Dark Samus reforming herself in deep space. 

Metroid Prime 3: Corruption shows a team of Space Pirates returned to Aether to pick up Phazon, and eventually found Dark Samus, who killed a third of the Pirates and brainwashed the rest to be their leader. After discovering Phaaze, Dark Samus begins her mission to spread Phazon across the universe - one of the planets hit was the Pirate Homeworld, in order to turn the rest of the Space Pirates into followers of Dark Samus. In an attack to the Galactic Federation vessel G.F.S. Valhalla, Dark Samus steals a supercomputer, the Aurora Unit 313, which is used to implant a computer virus into the Galactic Federation's network of Aurora Units, crippling it. Shortly after, Dark Samus leads an attack on Norion, corrupting Samus and other bounty hunters with Phazon. After Samus destroys the Leviathans of four planets, she goes to Phaaze, where she finally defeats Dark Samus, who then merges itself with the Aurora Unit 313 in a last-ditch effort to defeat Samus. After the Aurora Unit is destroyed, Phaaze explodes, and all Phazon in the galaxy is rendered inert.

Dark Samus appears in Super Smash Bros. for Nintendo 3DS and Wii U as an Assist Trophy and an alternate costume for Samus. She also appears in Super Smash Bros. Ultimate with a similar set of moves to Samus, being labeled as an Echo Fighter.

IGN listed Dark Samus as the 88th best video game villain.

Ing Horde
The Ing horde is a race of powerful and intelligent dark creatures that appears primarily in Metroid Prime 2: Echoes. They are capable of possessing anything mechanical, organic, artificial, dead, or alive (including the eponymous Metroids, which the X Parasites can't due to the Chozo specifically engineering the Metroids to hunt the X), and originated when a Leviathan from Phaaze impacted the planet Aether and created Dark Aether, a trans-dimensional duplicate of the planet. The Luminoth, the inhabitants of Aether, fight against the Ing over the Light of Aether, the planet's power source, for decades, in spite of disadvantages, and the Ing appear to be on the verge of victory, until Samus Aran enters the picture when she comes to Aether, looking for a missing Galactic Federation squad. Samus assists the Luminoth in their war, recovering the lost energy, and ultimately enters the Sky Temple, where she confronts the Emperor Ing, the Ing horde's leader and the main antagonist of the game. Despite the Emperor Ing being very powerful thanks to the last of Dark Aether's planetary energy and great amounts of Phazon, Samus defeats the creature and takes the remaining planetary energy, putting an end to Dark Aether and the Ing horde for good. During her escape from the destabilizing Dark Aether, Samus is confronted by Dark Samus, who she barely defeats, and then a group of Ing attempting to stop her from escaping, which she narrowly escapes from using a light portal previously hidden behind a wall of Phazon. The Ing then perish along with Dark Aether.

Gorea
Gorea is a powerful, malevolent being that crashed in the Alimbic Cluster a millennia ago. In Metroid Prime Hunters, the lore mentions that it came by a comet and struck the planet Alinos, thus shattering the Alimbic Utopia. The creature copied the cellular structure of the Alimbics, physically mimicking them and their weapons, and destroyed their civilization. In a final attempt to stop Gorea's rampage, the last of their race focused their telepathic energy to confine Gorea into a "Seal Sphere", which they placed in a starship called the Oubliette. The ship was launched into a dimensional rift called the Infinity Void, to be released only when eight keys called "Octoliths" were assembled. During the battle, it is revealed that Gorea's formless matter comes from a shapeless gas, and can therefore undergo several different forms in battle.

Rival Bounty Hunters

Sylux
Sylux is one of the bounty hunters in Metroid Prime Hunters. He is Samus' rival and is the most personal one with her out of all the other hunters, due to association with the Galactic Federation, which he harbors a great hatred towards for unexplained reasons. Though he is rescued by Samus at the end of the game, it appears he still seeks her death, as the 100% ending's post-credit scene of Metroid Prime 3: Corruption showed his ship following her. Sylux also appears (presumed via silhouette) in a post-credits scene of Metroid Prime: Federation Force.

According to Metroid Prime series producer Kensuke Tanabe, a planned storyline for Metroid Prime 4 would focus on Sylux and Samus.

Kanden
One of Samus' rivals in Metroid Prime Hunters, he is a frequent enemy. He was born in an attempt to create the perfect soldier, and as a consequence is unpredictable and dangerous. He seeks to prove he is the best Hunter by attaining the ultimate power in the Alimbic Cluster, but like the other hunters, is initially unaware of the vastly powerful creature that resides there. His special weapon is the Volt Driver, which shoots bolts of lightning that disrupt Samus' visor should they strike her.

Noxus
A bounty hunter of the proud and reclusive Vhozon race and one of Samus' rivals in Metroid Prime Hunters. He seeks the ultimate power in the Alimbic Cluster in order to prevent it from falling into the wrong hands but like the other hunters is unaware of Gorea, who sent the message to simply lure them there. His weapon is Judicator which can freeze opponents on their tracks with a charged shot.

Spire
A bounty hunter and the last survivor of the silicon-based Diamont race and one of Samus' rivals in Metroid Prime Hunters. He searches for answers about the fate and location of his race and after receiving the message of the ultimate power, he travels to the Alimbic Cluster to use the said power for the same purpose. His weapon is Magmaul which can fire molten projectiles that will splash lava after explosion.

Trace
A feared member of the Kriken Empire and one of Samus' rivals in Metroid Prime Hunters. He searches for other planets for his people to invade and wishes to use the ultimate power in the Alimbic Cluster to make himself and his people stronger. His weapon is Imperialist, a very precise sniping gun.

Weavel
A Space Pirate who was severely wounded in a fight against Samus and became a cyborg in order to survive. In Metroid Prime Hunters, he is one of the bounty hunters looking for the ultimate power in the Alimbic Cluster and his weapon of choice is Battlehammer.

Galactic Federation Bio-Weapons Research Projects
A small group within the Federation government which is responsible for the events in Metroid: Other M and serves as a behind-the-scenes antagonist in Metroid Fusion. Secretly, this unnamed group within the Federation planned to breed Metroids and other creatures, like the Zebesians, to be used as bio-weapons, employing various methods to keep their activities a secret from the rest of galactic society. In Other M, they are revealed to have used genetic remnants of the baby Metroid obtained off Samus' powersuit after her mission on Zebes to genetically engineer a new breed of Metroid immune to the effect of cold temperatures.

However, this project was foiled by the accidental cloning of Ridley and the rebellion of MB, the Mother Brain-like android created to control the Metroids. This leads to the interference of Adam Malkovich's team of soldiers and Samus, but one of their operatives called "The Deleter" by Samus, infiltrates Adam's squad to remove any evidence of the project. While it is not explicitly stated, the Deleter was in fact James Pierce, the squad's communications expert. The presence of Samus derails James' mission, though he does manage to kill several members of Adam's squad before he himself was found dead in the Bioweapons Research Center: it can be surmised that he tried to eliminate MB, but failed. An unnamed scientist who cleans the Metroid and Ridley's DNA off Samus is implied to be a member or operative for the group. Additionally, an unnamed GF colonel who orders MB's destruction and attempts to force Samus to handover Madeline Bergman using the fact she is an outsider to force her to comply is implied to either work for or a top ranking member of the group and may have been the one responsible for sending the Deleter to eliminate Adam and his team before they could uncover and expose their bio-weapons research as he is a member of the Galactic Federation military. The actions of Samus and Adam's heroic sacrifice put an end to their bio-weapons research on the Bottle Ship, but their secret bio-weapons research and Metroid breeding program continues on the B.S.L. research station until it is overrun by the X parasites. In Fusion, Samus discovers the continued bio-weapons research and learns that they foolishly plan to capture the X parasites and the SA-X for the bio-weapons research, and crashes the station into the planet SR388 with the help of her ship's AI, which was based on Adam Malkovich.

It is also believed that they are also responsible for the creation of the power suit, weapons, and ship stolen by the Federation-hating bounty hunter Sylux from Metroid Prime Hunters.

Nightmare
The  is a gravity-controlling, monster cyborg originally created by the Galactic Federation's secret bio-weapons project. In Other M, Samus encountered the Nightmare for the first time in her life while on her journey to Sector Zero on the Bottle Ship. The creature fights Samus twice; once when she tries to enter Sector Zero, and again when she tries to exit the same sector. In Fusion, an X parasite infects and revives Nightmare contained in Sector 5-ARC. It escapes and destroys ARC's data room. Samus confronts Nightmare-X, defeating and absorbing its Core-X, obtaining the Gravity Suit upgrade.

X Parasites
The X Parasite is a unique parasite witnessed in Metroid Fusion, Metroid: Samus Returns, Metroid Dread and the Metroid manga. They are the main antagonists of Fusion.

The appearance of an X Parasite is simple: a basketball-sized, floating gelatinous life form. The structure of their bodies allow them to slip through the tiniest crevices of any organism or synthetic surface; their soft form also allows projectiles to harmlessly pass through them. Additionally, they have the ability to split into smaller colonies via asexual reproduction.

X are capable of infecting other organisms and mimicking their prey's DNA and memories. They do this by infecting the organism's nervous system where they then start reproducing at an exponential rate, killing the host creature in the process. Once that is accomplished, the X absorb the DNA of their host and are then able to use it to mimic their prey perfectly.

X can also mimic biomechanical technology such as the Security Robot B.O.X. and Samus' Power Suit. After being infected by the X, Samus' infected Power Suit components were surgically removed and sent to B.S.L. station. Unfortunately, this allowed the X to mimic Samus and her Power Suit, creating another doppelgänger of Samus called SA-X. SA-X is implied to have used a Power Bomb to escape the infected Power Suit components containment unit, thus allowing the X to spread and infect countless creatures throughout the B.S.L. (the exception being the Etecoons and Dachora). SA-X mimicked Samus at her most powerful, proving to be a dangerous foe for the weakened Samus, and passed on some of Samus' Power Suit abilities to Core-X. SA-X also gained Samus' Ice Beam and Metroid hunting knowledge, making SA-X the only X capable of taking on the X parasites natural predator, the Metroid, which was secretly being bred on the B.S.L. station.

SA-X attacked Sector 0 to destroy the Metroids, inadvertently initiating the Sector's self-destruct mechanism, which Samus escapes. However, Adam then reveals that due to their ability to asexually reproduce there are more SA-X aboard the station. Eventually, Adam discloses the Federation’s plans to send a team to capture SA-X and the X parasites for research. While trying to convince him of the insanity of the Federation's plan, Samus is able to restore the computer's original personality of Adam Malkovich, who then advises Samus on how to destroy the station and the X by crashing it into SR388. This leads Samus to confront the SA-X which, after being weakened, transforms into a misshapen monster that is an amalgamation of Samus' power suit and a Hornoad, before it is defeated by Samus. Unfortunately, its Core-X escapes, preventing Samus from absorbing it.

As Samus attempts to escape the station, she is injured by a surviving Metroid in its Omega state. The SA-X reappears and ironically ends up saving Samus’ life when it attempts to destroy the Omega Metroid. Unexpectedly, the SA-X is defeated by the Metroid, allowing Samus to absorb SA-X's Core-X, which includes Samus’ Ice Beam, and gives her Fusion Suit the same coloration as her Power Suit. These enhancements allow Samus to defeat the Omega Metroid and escape the B.S.L., which then crashes into SR388, destroying both and therefore killing all the X Parasites aboard the station and on the planet.

The final X Parasites are contained in Elun on the planet ZDR, and midway through Metroid Dread are released by Raven Beak to hinder Samus. The bosses Escue and Golzuna, as well as the Chozo Soldiers, are all X, and Raven Beak himself is infected by an X after being defeated by Samus. The detonation of ZDR at the game's finale presumably marks their extinction.

Raven Beak

Raven Beak is the leader of the Chozo warrior tribe called Mawkin and the main antagonist of Metroid Dread. He indirectly played a role in the plot of most other titles, as he was responsible for the initial dispersal of the Metroids and X Parasites from SR388. He was a high-ranking member of the Mawkin, and donated his DNA to infuse into Samus, technically making them biologically related. When the Thoha intended to destroy the planet to eliminate the threat of the Metroids and X, Raven Beak ordered their extermination, with the exception of Quiet Robe, as he needed a pawn to use to control the Metroids. He intended to create a Metroid army and conquer the galaxy, but the spread of the X among the Chozo ruined his plans. However, once he learned that Samus had absorbed Metroid DNA during the events of Metroid Fusion, he changed his plan to capture and clone her instead. When the Galactic Federation sends E.M.M.I. units to ZDR to investigate signs of X Parasites, he orders Quiet Robe to commandeer them, planning to exploit their ability to harvest genetic information. When Samus arrives on ZDR, Raven Beak fights her, gaining the upper hand even at her full power, but when her Metroid abilities initially manifest themselves he leaves her alone. He tracks her progress through ZDR, masquerading as Adam Malkovich, and sets the E.M.M.I upon her. When she arrives at his fortress he expresses his disappointment in her disobedience, drops the guise of Adam, and engages her in combat. He once again gains the upper hand, but her Metroid DNA fully awakens and she is able to easily defeat him. On the brink of death, he merges with an X Parasite, turning into Raven Beak X, a massive monster resembling Kraid with a radially symmetrical mouth that contains his head. This form is destroyed by Samus using her Metroid abilities. Raven Beak and Quiet Robe do not speak English (not counting the former's impersonation of ADAM), but actually speak the fictional Chozo language; both are voiced by Spanish voice actors.

Supporting characters

Adam Malkovich

Samus' former commanding officer in the Galactic Federation army. He only appears in person in Metroid: Other M, but plays a major role in the events of that game. At first, he does not accept Samus' assistance, but lets up after she defeats a hostile on the bridge. After this, he is responsible for authorizing the use of Samus' weapons, with the exceptions of the Seeker Missile and the Diffusion Beam, which are found instead, and the Gravity Feature, which Samus activates herself while leaving Sector Zero. He is generally cool and collected even when under fire, but some of this is temporarily lost when he sees Ridley on the control room monitor. He was nonetheless able to outwit James when he suddenly appears in the Control Room. Samus and Adam are shown to have had a very close relationship: Samus does not explicitly mention it herself, but he sees her as a daughter as she saw him as a father. It was this that drove him to first detach his ship and a space liner with three thousand passengers on board from a repair ship with his brother on board in the past, and enter Sector Zero of the Bottle Ship in Samus' place in the present: both of these actions were taken for the greater good, and for the good of Samus herself. Upon entering Sector Zero, he activates the laboratory's self-destruct protocol, sacrificing himself. While Samus vows not to grieve his death, she also vows not to forget him, and gives him a thumbs up sign instead of a thumbs down, indicating that she knows what he would have wanted: for her to live her life for the both of them. In Metroid Fusion, it is revealed that the Navigation Computer of the ship is Adam Malkovich's consciousness in computer form. This computer consciousness returns in Metroid Dread, albeit impersonated for most of the game by Raven Beak.

Aurora Unit 242
Voiced by: Lainie Frasier
An organic supercomputer who only appears in Metroid Prime 3: Corruption. It has been installed on the G.F.S. Olympus, and was originally intended to be part of an Aurora Complex before Dark Samus' intervention.

Fleet Admiral Castor Dane

The commander of the Galactic Federation Starfleet and the captain of the flagship Olympus. Like Samus, Dane lost his family to the Space Pirates when he was young, an act he still seeks revenge for. In Metroid Prime 3: Corruption, he sought the help of bounty hunters Samus, Rundas, Ghor and Gandrayda against the Space Pirates who are waging war on Federation using Phazon. At the end of the game, he leads the Federation Fleet in an attack on planet Phaaze, the source of Phazon.

Rundas

A bounty hunter hired by the Galactic Federation in Metroid Prime 3: Corruption. In the beginning of this game, he is shown to be arrogant, but nonetheless willing to help his fellow hunters, as evident by him saving Samus from Meta Ridley during the battle on Norion. As a member of the Phrygisians, an alien race from the moon Phrygis, he is capable of cryokinesis. During the battle on Norion, he and the other hunters are corrupted by Dark Samus' Phazon attacks. Unlike Samus, he succumbs to the corruption while investigating the planet Bryyo and is fought there as a boss opponent. After he is defeated, he loses control of his cryokinesis and unintentionally impales himself on a large icicle. An apparition of Dark Samus appears immediately afterward and absorbs his remains in order to gain his cryokinesis.

Ghor

A bounty hunter hired by the Galactic Federation in Metroid Prime 3: Corruption. An alien of unknown origin, he has replaced 94% of his birth body with cybernetic prostheses as a result of injuries suffered in the liberation war of Wotan VII. Despite this, he retains empathy and a compassionate personality. As a result of his cybernetic prostheses, he utilizes a heavily armed battle armor in combat and also as a means of travel. Although his battle armor grants him incredible physical strength and powerful weaponry, it also results in him gaining an aggressive and violent temperament. Upon being corrupted by Dark Samus, he loses all facets of his normal personality and is constantly aggressive. Despite this, Samus defeats him in battle, although she tries in vain to prevent Dark Samus from absorbing his remains and gaining his plasma beam.

Gandrayda

A bounty hunter who was hired by the Galactic Federation in Metroid Prime 3: Corruption. An alien of unknown origin, she is capable of highly advanced shapeshifting and electrokinesis. She has a playful nature and often refers to Samus as "Sammy" while viewing her as a rival. When she succumbs to Phazon corruption, she retains her playful nature, but becomes far more vicious and calculating while her shapeshifting abilities are further enhanced, making her a dangerous boss opponent. She disguises herself as a Federation Marine and offers to help Samus acquire a suit shield to reach the Leviathan Seed on the Pirate Homeworld. However, she then attempts, but fails, to shoot Samus from behind, and reveals herself before chiding Samus and engaging her in battle. Like Rundas and Ghor, she fails to kill Samus and has her remains and electrokinesis subsequently absorbed by Dark Samus. The last thing Samus sees of her fellow bounty hunter is Gandrayda, shapeshifted into Samus in her PED Power Suit, reaching out to her and screaming in agony. Samus is forced to look away and clench her fist in anger at Dark Samus before its apparition finishes off Gandrayda.

Anthony Higgs

A soldier assigned to Adam's platoon, and an old acquaintance of Samus'. He was the squad's point man, and carries a plasma gun which does extraordinary damage to creatures but takes a long time to recharge. He generally has a jocular nature, but is also caring and dependable. He affectionately refers to Samus as "Princess" and saves Samus from Ridley twice the first time when Samus fights Ridley clone's wingless Mysterious Creature form and the second when Samus' suffered a PTSD flashback to her childhood up after seeing Ridley's clone which due to her fragile emotional state (brought on by grief of the death of The Baby, her reunion with Adam and Anthony, and presumably guilt for briefly suspecting Anthony was the Deleter). He heroically distracts Ridley Clone from Samus tries to maintain her concentration and her power suit. He seemingly dies in Sector three's geothermal power plant when pushed off the platform by a sudden tail attack from Ridley, but cheats the odds by using a freeze gun to freeze a fire creature and jettisoning his plasma gun. He was briefly thought to be the deleter by Samus, but this is proved to be wrong though. As he is the only surviving member of Adam's platoon as the others where all killed by the Deleter who was killed by MB, Anthony uses his position and Adam's orders to help Samus keep Madeline Bergman from being taken by the GF Colonel and his men (who are implied to have been sent to cover-up the secret Bio-Weapons Research and would have likely had killed Bergman or use her as a scapegoat to conceal their activities). It is implied that Anthony and Samus used Madeline's testimony to expose the Bio-Weapons research on the Bottle Ship.

Madeline Bergman

The adopted mother of MB and director of operations on the Bottle ship. In addition to nicknaming MB Melissa, she gave her a hairpin which she wore until the end of the main story (this hairpin was trampled on by the GF colonel). On the day MB's programming was to be changed, Madeline had at first resisted the decision, but relented, leading to MB's rampage through the Bottle Ship. This rampage had caused a great fear in Madeline, but she overcame it and reaches out emotionally to MB, promising to not let her down again, but was rejected. When MB was killed, she breaks down, kneeling before her adopted daughter and crying uncontrollably. She then accompanies Samus and Anthony back to Earth. She falls asleep along the way, muttering softly that MB was not insane, a sentiment echoed by Samus herself. It is unknown what happens to Madeline after this, but presumably she helps Anthony and Samus expose the Federation's Bio-Weapon Research.

Etecoons and Dachora
The Etecoons and Dachora are friendly creatures that Samus encounters on planet Zebes in Super Metroid, and show her how to perform the Wall-jump and Shinespark, respectively. At the end of the game, during the escape from Zebes, Samus can help the Dachora and Etecoons to escape as well by going to an earlier room and blasting open the wall, providing an exit for them. After the planet explodes, they are shown flying off to the right, if Samus took the time to save them. Samus meets them again in Metroid Fusion at the Habitation Deck. After releasing them, they find shelter on board Samus's ship. Later on, it is revealed they have a hidden talent with ships.

Quiet Robe 

The only surviving member of the Thoha tribe, kept in service to Raven Beak to control the Metroids and E.M.M.I. units. He saves her from an E.M.M.I. in Ferenia and explains Raven Beak's plan, as well as opening a gate on the map that previously blocked further progress. However, after Samus assures Quiet Robe that she will stop Raven Beak's plans, he is killed by one of Raven Beak's drone soldiers. After the X Parasites are released from Elun, one of them reanimates Quiet Robe and puppets his body to reactivate the remaining E.M.M.I. After Raven Beak's defeat, however, the undead Quiet Robe returns to allow Samus to escape the planet on her ship without draining its energy with her Metroid abilities. As he is absorbed, he graciously bows to Samus, showing that, uniquely among X victims, a remnant of his personality may still remain even after infection. Both Quiet Robe and Raven Beak speak the fictional Chozo language in cutscenes, and are voiced by Spanish voice actors in all regions of the game.

Notes

References

Metroid
Metroid characters
Metroids